Wardle may refer to:

Places
Wardle, Greater Manchester, England
Wardle, Cheshire, England

People
Arthur Wardle (1864–1949), English painter
David Wardle (born 1959), classicist
Ernie Wardle (born 1930), English footballer
Harry Wardle (1881–1918), English footballer
Huon Wardle, (born 1967), English anthropologist
Jah Wobble, stage name of John Joseph Wardle (born 1958), English musician
Johnny Wardle, (1923–1985), English cricketer
Josh Wardle, software engineer and creator of Wordle
Piers Wardle, (1960–2009), English painter and conceptual artist
Sarah Wardle, (born 1969), English poet
Thomas Wardle, (1912–1977), Australian businessman
Thomas Erskine Wardle, (1877–1944), Royal Navy admiral

See also
Wardell (disambiguation)

English-language surnames